Caleb Ryan Wiley (born December 22, 2004) is an American professional soccer player who plays as a defender for Major League Soccer club Atlanta United.

Career

Early career
Wiley joined the Atlanta United academy at the age of 11, just before the professional outfit began their inaugural Major League Soccer season, and was heavily involved with the club up until his debut with Atlanta United 2 in 2020. In 2018, Wiley served as a ball boy as Atlanta defeated the Portland Timbers in the 2018 MLS Cup final.

In July 2020, Wiley made his professional debut with Atlanta's USL Championship affiliate, appearing in a 2–1 defeat to the Tampa Bay Rowdies.

Professional
On January 18, 2022, Wiley signed a homegrown player contract with Atlanta United. In February, he made his MLS debut against Sporting Kansas City, scoring late in Atlanta's 3–1 victory. With the team suffering from a number of injuries, Wiley found himself moving up the depth chart, finishing the 2022 season with 26 league appearances to his name. 

In February 2023, Wiley was named amongst American Soccer Now's top 20 young Americans to watch during the 2023 Major League Soccer season. It didn't take Wiley long to live up to those expectations, scoring twice and providing an additional assist in Atlanta's week three victory over Charlotte FC. At 18 years and 79 days of age, he became the fifth-youngest player in league history to contribute to three goals in a single game. As a result of that performance, he was named to the league's Team of the Matchday for week three and was named Player of the Week.

International
In early 2020, Wiley, alongside Atlanta United Academy teammate Efrain Morales, was called up to the United States U17 squad for a UEFA Development Tournament taking place in England. He made his youth international debut on February 19, 2020, playing the entirety of a 2-1 defeat to Spain. In November 2021, at just 16 years of age, he was called up to the United States U20 roster.

Career statistics

Club

References

External links
Caleb Wiley at US Soccer Development Academy

2004 births
Living people
Atlanta United 2 players
Atlanta United FC players
USL Championship players
American soccer players
Association football defenders
Soccer players from Georgia (U.S. state)
United States men's under-20 international soccer players
Homegrown Players (MLS)
United Premier Soccer League players
Major League Soccer players